EUROfusion is a consortium of national fusion research institutes located in the European Union, the UK, Switzerland and Ukraine. It was established in 2014 to succeed the European Fusion Development Agreement (EFDA) as the umbrella organisation of Europe's fusion research laboratories. The consortium is currently funded by the Euratom Horizon 2020 programme.

Organisation
The EUROfusion consortium agreement has been signed by 30 research organisations and universities from 25 European Union countries plus Switzerland, Ukraine and the United Kingdom.

The EUROfusion's Programme Management Unit offices located in Garching, near Munich (Germany), are hosted by the Max Planck Institute of Plasma Physics (IPP). The IPP is also the seat for the co-ordinator of EUROfusion.

Activities
EUROfusion funds fusion research activities in accordance with the Roadmap to the realisation of fusion energy. The Roadmap outlines the most efficient way to realise fusion electricity by 2050. Research carried out under the EUROfusion umbrella aims to prepare for ITER experiments and develop concepts for the fusion power demonstration plant DEMO. EUROfusion is in charge of the fusion-related research carried out at JET, the Joint European Torus, which is housed in the Culham Centre for Fusion Energy, UK.  Other fusion devices in Europe that devote some amount of time towards research under the EUROfusion framework include the following:

References

Further reading
 ITER
 Joint European Torus (JET)
 Fusion for Energy
 DEMO 
 Euratom
 Max Planck Institute of Plasma Physics
 Culham Centre for Fusion Energy

External links
 

College and university associations and consortia in Europe
Fusion power
Organisations based in Munich
Physics in Germany
Research institutes in Germany
Science and technology in Europe